Öztürkmenli is a small village in Silifke district of Mersin Province, Turkey. The population of Öztürkmenli  was 77  as of 2011 . Mezgitkale, a Roman mausoleum is to the south east of the village.

References

Villages in Silifke District